Revati is a 2005 Indian Hindi film written and directed by Farogh Siddique. The film stars Kashmera Shah.

Plot 
The story of a rebel trash picker living in the slums of Bombay India. She dreams of being able to have simple luxuries like a bath or decent clothes to cover her body. One day she gets her opportunity through a drug smuggler of Bombay and quickly learns all that glitters is not gold. Whether it be a drug lord, a murder, rapist or the legal system; Revati is a fighter that keeps a sense of humor about her plight. Revati shows the life's struggles of a woman struggling to keep her morality and dignity in a place that tries hard to strip her of all she has in many extreme circumstances. Revati dares to be different and live by her own rules. Will she win and yet keep her morality? Will she survive?

Cast 
 Kashmera Shah
 Kiran Kumar
 Ayub Khan
 Vijay Kadam
 Shreyas Talpade as Chandu
Herman Dsouza...police Inspector

Music
Bijli Si Daude Anga Mere - Sunidhi Chauhan
Mehsoos Kar - Sona Kekhar
Mehsoos Kar (Remix) - Sona Kekhar
Mil Gayee Khwaab Ki Manzil - Shreya Ghoshal
Na Shikwa Karo - Kailash Kher
Pehle Jhagda Phir Ragda - Vinod Rathod

External links

2005 films
Films scored by Jatin–Lalit
2000s Hindi-language films
Films directed by Farogh Siddique